Prince  was a Japanese politician and general of the Imperial Japanese Army who served as the Prime Minister of Japan from 1901 to 1906, from 1908 to 1911, and from 1912 to 1913.

Katsura was a distinguished general of the First Sino-Japanese War and a genrō of the Meiji government who served as Governor-General of Taiwan and Minister of War. Katsura was appointed Prime Minister in 1901 as a military candidate and positioned himself as a conservative outside party politics. Katsura's first and second premierships oversaw several major events in modern Japanese history, including the Russo-Japanese War and the annexation of Korea. Katsura's third premiership triggered the Taisho Political Crisis, and he resigned three months later after a vote of no confidence.

Katsura is the second-longest serving Prime Minister of Japan, after Shinzō Abe, and served for 2883 days over his three terms from 1901 to 1913.

Early life
Katsura was born on 4 January 1848 in Hagi, Nagato Province (present-day Yamaguchi Prefecture) as the eldest son of horse guard Katsura Yoichiemon into a samurai family of the Chōshū Domain. As a youth, Katsura joined the movement against the Tokugawa shogunate and participated in the Boshin War that led to the Meiji Restoration in 1868.

Army career

The new Meiji government considered that Katsura displayed great talent, and in 1870 sent him to Germany to study military science. He served as military attaché at the Japanese embassy in Germany from 1875 to 1878 and again from 1884 to 1885. On his return to Japan, he was promoted to major general. He served in several key positions within the Imperial Japanese Army, and in 1886 was appointed Vice-Minister of War.

During the First Sino-Japanese War (1894–1895) Katsura commanded the IJA 3rd Division under his mentor, Field Marshal Yamagata Aritomo. During the war, his division made a memorable march in the depth of winter from the north-east shore of the Yellow Sea to Haicheng, finally occupying Niuchwang, and effecting a junction with the IJA 2nd Army which had moved up the Liaodong Peninsula.

After the war, he was elevated with the title of shishaku (viscount) under the kazoku peerage system. He was appointed 2nd Governor-General of Taiwan from 2 June 1896, to October 1896.

In successive cabinets from 1898 to 1901, he served as Minister of War.

Prime Minister

Katsura Tarō served as the 11th, 13th and 15th prime minister of Japan. His position as the longest-serving prime minister of Japan (total length) was surpassed by Shinzō Abe on 20 November 2019.

First administration

Katsura became prime minister for the first time on 2 June 1901, and he retained the office for four and a half years to 7 January 1906, which was then a record in Japan. Japan emerged as a major imperialist power in East Asia. In terms of foreign affairs, it was marked by the Anglo-Japanese Alliance of 1902 and victory over the Russian Empire in the Russo-Japanese War of 1904–1905. During his tenure, the Taft–Katsura agreement, accepting Japanese hegemony over Korea, was reached with the United States. Katsura received the Grand Cross of the Order of St Michael and St George from British King Edward VII and was elevated to the rank of marquess by Emperor Meiji.

In terms of domestic policy, Katsura was a strictly conservative politician who attempted to distance himself from the Diet of Japan and party politics. His political views mirrored that of Yamagata Aritomo in that he viewed that his sole responsibility was to the Emperor. He vied for control of the government with the Rikken Seiyūkai, the majority party of the lower house, headed by his archrival, Marquess Saionji Kinmochi.

In January 1906, Katsura resigned the premiership to Saionji Kinmochi over the unpopular Treaty of Portsmouth (1905), ending the war between Japan and Russia. However, his resignation was part of a "back door deal," brokered by Hara Takashi to alternate power between Saionji and Hara.

On 1 April 1906, he was awarded the Grand Cordon of the Supreme Order of the Chrysanthemum.

Second administration

Katsura returned as Prime Minister from 14 July 1908, to 30 August 1911. His second term was noteworthy for the Japan–Korea Annexation Treaty of 1910. He also promulgated the Factory Act in 1911, the first act for the purpose of labor protection in Japan.

Katsura was increasingly unpopular during his second term over public perception that he was using his office to further both his personal fortune and the interests of the military (gunbatsu) over the welfare of the people.  He also faced growing public dissatisfaction over the persistence of the hanbatsu domainal based politics.

After his resignation, he became a kōshaku (公爵 = prince), Lord Keeper of the Privy Seal of Japan and one of the genrō.

Third administration
Katsura's brief reappointment again as Prime Minister again from 21 December 1912, to 20 February 1913, sparked widespread riots in what became known as the Taisho Political Crisis. His appointment was viewed as a plot by the genrō to overthrow the Meiji Constitution. However, rather than compromising, Katsura created his own political party, the Rikken Dōshikai (Constitutional Association of Allies) in an effort to establish his own support base. 

However, faced with a no-confidence motion, the first successful one in Japanese history, and the loss of the support of his backers, he was forced to resign in February 1913. He was succeeded by Yamamoto Gonnohyōe.

Death

Katsura died of stomach cancer eight months later on 10 October 1913, aged 65. His funeral was held at the temple of Zōjō-ji in Shiba, Tokyo and his grave is at the Shōin Jinja, in Setagaya, Tokyo.

Honors
From the corresponding article in the Japanese Wikipedia

Titles
Viscount (20 August 1895)
Count (27 February 1902)
Marquess (21 September 1907)
Prince (21 April 1911)

Decorations

Japanese
Grand Cordon of the Order of the Sacred Treasure (20 August 1895; Second Class: 11 May 1891)
Order of the Golden Kite, 3rd class (20 August 1895)
Grand Cordon of the Order of the Rising Sun (27 December 1901; Third Class: 19 November 1885; Fourth Class: 26 May 1880)
Grand Cordon of the Order of the Paulownia Flowers (10 October 1913; posthumous)
Collar of the Order of the Chrysanthemum (10 October 1913, Awarded a few hours before his death; Grand Cordon: 1 April 1906)

Foreign
 : 
 Knight of the Order of the White Eagle (1 May 1899)
 Knight of the Order of St. Alexander Nevsky in Brilliants (11 November 1911)
 :
 Grand Cross of the Order of the Red Eagle (4 October 1906; Knight 1st Class: 3 February 1900)
 Knight of the Order of Merit of the Prussian Crown (19 September 1912)
  Duchy of Brunswick: Knight 1st Class of the Order of Henry the Lion (1 July 1910)
 : Grand Officer of the Legion d'Honneur (16 April 1901)
 : Honorary Knight Grand Cross of the Order of the Bath (GCB) (8 July 1905)
  Holy See: Knight Grand Cross of the Order of Pius IX (5 June 1906)
 : Grand Cordon of the Order of the Golden Ruler (21 December 1907)
 : Order of the Double Dragon, Class I Grade II (21 December 1907; Class I Grade III: 18 December 1899)

References

External links

1848 births
1913 deaths
20th-century prime ministers of Japan
Governors-General of Taiwan
Japanese generals
Kazoku
Honorary Knights Grand Cross of the Order of the Bath
Recipients of the Order of the Sacred Treasure
Recipients of the Order of the Golden Kite
Knights Grand Cross of the Order of Pope Pius IX
Grand Officiers of the Légion d'honneur
Members of the House of Peers (Japan)
Military personnel from Yamaguchi Prefecture
People of Meiji-period Japan
People of the Boshin War
Japanese military personnel of the First Sino-Japanese War
Japanese people of the Russo-Japanese War
Prime Ministers of Japan
Ministers of Finance of Japan
Government ministers of Japan
Ministers of Home Affairs of Japan
Rikken Dōshikai politicians
20th-century Japanese politicians
Deaths from stomach cancer
Deaths from cancer in Japan
Commanders of the Order of Franz Joseph
Foreign ministers of Japan
University and college founders
Burials in Japan